Kamgort is a rural locality (a selo) in Cherdynsky District, Perm Krai, Russia. The population was 152 as of 2010. There are 4 streets.

Geography 
Kamgort is located 22 km north of Cherdyn (the district's administrative centre) by road. Bigichi is the nearest rural locality.

References 

Rural localities in Cherdynsky District